Twm or TWM may refer to:
 twm, the default window manager for the X Window System
 Tanu Weds Manu, a 2011 Hindi romantic comedy film
 Tawang language (ISO-639: twm), spoken in India
 Teradata Warehouse Miner, data mining software
 Third World Media, an American pornographic film studio
 Tiling window manager, a class of window managers
 Tyne and Wear Metro

People 
 Twm Carnabwth (1806–1876), Welsh rebel
 Twm Morys (born 1961), Welsh poet and musician
 Twm o'r Nant (1739–1810), Welsh-language dramatist and poet
 Twm Siôn Cati, a figure of Welsh folklore